The R674 road is a regional road in County Waterford, Ireland. It runs from the N25 near Dungarvan eastwards through Ring and ending at Helvick Head.

References

Regional roads in the Republic of Ireland
Roads in County Waterford